Massimiliano Lelli (born 2 December 1967) is a former Italian professional cyclist. He most known for winning the Young rider Classification in the 1991 Giro d'Italia. His highest finishing in the Giro d'Italia was the year he won the Young rider classification, with a third place. He retired from cycling in 2004.

Major results

1989
 4th Giro di Toscana
 5th Overall Giro del Trentino
1990
 1st Stage 4 Tirreno–Adriatico
 3rd Coppa Bernocchi
 9th Overall Giro d'Italia
 10th GP Industria & Artigianato di Larciano
1991
 1st Giro di Toscana
 2nd Overall Giro del Trentino
 3rd Overall Giro d'Italia
1st  Young rider classification
1st Stages 12 & 16
 3rd Giro dell'Umbria
 5th Coppa Bernocchi
1992
 1st Stage 4 Giro di Puglia
 6th Overall Critérium International
 7th Overall Tour de Romandie
 9th Giro di Toscana
1993
 1st Giro di Toscana
 4th Overall Giro d'Italia
 5th Overall Settimana Internazionale di Coppi e Bartali
 9th Road race, National Road Championships
 9th Trofeo Melinda
1994
 6th Firenze–Pistoia
1995
 1st  Time trial, National Road Championships
 7th Overall Tirreno–Adriatico
1996
 1st  Overall Volta a Portugal
1st  Points classification
1st Stages 2, 4, 5 (ITT), 9, 12 & 14 (ITT)
 5th Tre Valli Varesine
 6th Gran Premio Industria e Commercio di Prato
 7th Coppa Bernocchi
1997
 1st US Pro Championship
1999
 5th Breitling Grand Prix (with Roland Meier)
2000
 4th Overall Critérium International
 4th EnBW Grand Prix (with David Millar)
 5th Overall Circuit de la Sarthe
 10th Overall Volta a la Comunitat Valenciana
2003
 1st  Overall Tour du Limousin

Grand Tour general classification results timeline

References

External links

1967 births
Living people
Italian male cyclists
People from Manciano
Sportspeople from the Province of Grosseto
Volta a Portugal winners
Cyclists from Tuscany